Chris Goode (27 May 1973 – 1 June 2021) was a British playwright, theatre director, performer, and poet. He was the artistic director of Camden People's Theatre from 2001 to 2004, and led the ensemble Chris Goode and Company until its closure in 2021.

A regular performer at the Edinburgh Festival Fringe, he won four Fringe First awards for Men in the Cities, Monkey Bars, Neutrino and Kiss of Life.

Goode hosted the regular podcast Thompson's Live, in which he curated discussions with other theatre artists about their practice.

His plays are published by Oberon Books.

Personal life 
Goode was married to sound designer and theatre artist Griffyn Gilligan.

Goode died by suicide on 1 June 2021. He had been arrested on 5 May for possession of indecent images of children.

Work

Solo shows 
 Mirabel (2018). Premiered at Ovalhouse Theatre, London.
 Men in the Cities (2014). Premiered at Traverse Theatre, Edinburgh.
 God/Head (2012). Premiered at Ovalhouse Theatre, London.
 The Adventures of Wound Man and Shirley (2009). Premiered at Contact Theatre, Manchester.
 Hippo World Guest Book (2007). Premiered at Pleasance Dome, Edinburgh.

As playwright 
 Mad Man (2014). Premiered at The Drum, Theatre Royal Plymouth.
 Infinite Lives (2014). Premiered at Tobacco Factory Theatre, Bristol.
 Monkey Bars (2012). Premiered at Traverse Theatre, Edinburgh.
 The Loss of All Things (2011). Part of the Bush Theatre's Sixty-Six Books.
 King Pelican (2009). Premiered at The Drum, Theatre Royal Plymouth.
 Speed Death of the Radiant Child (2007) Premiered at The Drum, Theatre Royal Plymouth. Revived at the Warwick Arts Centre (2017).

As director 
 Jubilee (2017) adapted from Derek Jarman. Premiered at Manchester Royal Exchange Theatre.
 Every One (2016) by Jo Clifford. Premiered at Battersea Arts Centre.
 Landscape and Monologue (2011) by Harold Pinter. Premiered at the Ustinov Studio, Theatre Royal Bath.  
 Glass House (2009). Premiered in the Clore Studio, Royal Opera House.

References 

1973 births
2021 deaths
2021 suicides
British male dramatists and playwrights
21st-century British dramatists and playwrights
21st-century British male writers
Suicides in the United Kingdom
British LGBT dramatists and playwrights
LGBT men
21st-century LGBT people